Smith & Wesson Model 460 is a large bore five-shot, single-action/double-action revolver by Smith & Wesson chambered for the .460 S&W Magnum cartridge. It was designed as a hunting and dangerous game defensive revolver for use in Africa and Alaska. The revolver is built on the company's largest and strongest frame, known as the X-Frame, and represents a joint effort among Smith & Wesson, Hornady, and Cor-Bon.

Design
The basic design of the Model 460 is based on the other X-frame revolver, its counterpart, the Smith & Wesson Model 500, a .50 caliber revolver.

Aside from the .460 S&W Magnum cartridge, the revolver can chamber .454 Casull and .45 Colt ammunition.

The S&W Model 460 won the Shooting Industry Academy of Excellence Handgun of the year Award when it debuted in 2005.

Variants
Smith & Wesson offers several variants of this revolver. Some with short barrels like the Model 460 ES are intended for use in survival kits in small planes should they crash land in Alaskan Bear Country while others with barrels as long as 14" are intended as a primary hunting arm.

 Model 460 ES 2.75" Barrel, Emergency Survival snubnosed revolver with neon yellow Hogue grips (no longer manufactured)
 Model 460 XVR Performance Center 3.5" Barrel, HI-VIZ® Fiber Optic Green front sight
 Model 460 V 5" Barrel, Muzzle Brake (the V stands for 5 referring to the length of the barrel)
 Model 460 V 5" Barrel, Muzzle Brake "OD Green Carry Combo" (OD green Hogue grips, DeSantis green digital camo holster, DeSantis green digital belt ammo carrier; Custom OD green S&W gun case)
 Model 460 XVR 8.38" Barrel, Muzzle Brake
 Model 460 XVR Performance Center 10.5" Barrel, Muzzle Brake, Sling Swivels, Picatinny rail top
 Model 460 XVR Performance Center 12" Barrel, Sling Swivels, Picatinny rail top and bottom
 Model 460 XVR Performance Center 14" Barrel, Muzzle Brake, Sling Swivels, Picatinny rail top and bottom, bipod

References

 Smith & Wesson "X" frame revolvers

Smith & Wesson revolvers
Revolvers of the United States
Weapons and ammunition introduced in 2005
.45 Colt firearms
.454 Casull firearms